This is the discography of French DJ and producer Bob Sinclar. He has released seven studio albums.

Albums

Studio albums

Compilation, DJ mix and remix albums

Singles

Remixes
 Barbara Tucker – "I Get Lifted"
 Cerrone – "Give Me Love"
 Towa Tei – "Let Me Know"
 David Guetta – "It's Alright"
 Lu Colombo – "Maracaibo"
 Yves Larock featuring R. Richards – "Zookey" 
 Stardust – "Music Sounds Better with You" 
 Madonna – "4 Minutes"
 Rihanna – "Don't Stop the Music"
 Mika – "We Are Golden"
 Serge Gainsbourg – "Marabout"
 The Wanted - "I Found You"

References

Discographies of French artists
Electronic music discographies
House music discographies